Wade "Wade-o" Liddell born 1 June 1979 is a former Scotland international rugby league footballer who played as a  for the Easts Tigers in the Queensland Cup.. He has previously played for the Gateshead Thunder.

Background
Wade Liddell was born in Brisbane, Queensland, Australia, he has Scottish ancestors, and eligible to play for Scotland due to the grandparent rule.

Playing career
He was named in the Scotland training squad for the 2008 Rugby League World Cup.

He has been named in the Scotland squad for the 2008 Rugby League World Cup.

He played in 163 games for the Easts Tigers in the Queensland Cup. He scored 65 tries and a total of 290 points.

He played for the Souths Logan Magpies in the 2011 Queensland Cup.

References

External links
Souths Logan Magpies profile
Easts Tigers profile
RLWC08 profile
Statistics at rugbyleagueproject.org

1979 births
Living people
Australian people of Scottish descent
Australian expatriate sportspeople in England
Australian rugby league players
Eastern Suburbs Tigers players
Newcastle Thunder players
Rugby league fullbacks
Rugby league players from Brisbane
Scotland national rugby league team players
Souths Logan Magpies players